WSVA(550 kHz) is a commercial radio station licensed to Harrisonburg, Virginia, and serving the Central Shenandoah Valley.  It broadcasts a talk radio format and is owned by Saga Communications, through licensee Tidewater Communications, LLC.  The studios and offices are on Heritage Center Way in Harrisonburg.

By day, WSVA is powered at 5,000 watts non-directional.  But at night, to protect other stations on 550 AM from interference, it reduces power to 1,000 watts and uses a directional antenna with a three-tower array.  The transmitter is on Garbers Church Road near West Market Street (U.S. Route 33) in Harrisonburg.  Programming is also heard on 250-watt FM translator W221CF at 92.1 MHz.

Programming
The WSVA weekday schedule begins with Early Mornings with Frank Wilt and Jim Britt.  Mike Schikman hosts afternoon drive time.  At noon, an hour of news and agricultural reports airs.  The rest of the weekday schedule is nationally syndicated talk programs: The Hugh Hewitt Show, The Mark Levin Show, CBS Eye on the World with John Batchelor, Red Eye Radio, America in the Morning and The Markley, Van Camp and Robbins Show.  

Weekends feature shows on money, car repair, home repair, travel and gardening.  Weekend syndicated programs include The Larry Kudlow Show, The Sebastian Gorka Show, Rudy Maxa's World, The Lars Larson Show, The Kim Komando Show, Music and the Spoken Word and The Car Doctor with Ron Annanian.  Most hours begin with an update from CBS Radio News.

WSVA broadcasts local sports including James Madison University football and basketball, along with high school football, basketball and baseball.

History

Early years
It was the first radio station to broadcast in Virginia's Shenandoah Valley. The station was owned by Frederick L. Allman and the original power was only 500 watts. Although it appears that the call letters stand for Shenandoah VAlley, they actually stand for We Serve Virginia Agriculture." The station was an affiliate of the NBC Red Network, carrying its dramas, comedies, news, sports, soap operas, game shows and big band broadcasts during the "Golden Age of Radio." Locally, it offered news, agricultural programs, music and talk.

In 1946, it added the Shenandoah Valley's first FM station, WSVA-FM (now WQPO).  And in 1953, it put Channel 3 on the air, WSVA-TV (now WHSV-TV).  Because 550 AM was an NBC affiliate, WSVA-TV mostly carried NBC television shows, but it also broadcast some programs from CBS, ABC and the Dumont Television Network.  Allman sold his stations to a partnership of Transcontinent Television and former NBC executive Hamilton Shea in 1956, earning a significant return on his investment of 21 years earlier.

Washington Star
In the 1950s, as network programming moved from radio to television, WSVA switched to a full service radio format of middle of the road (MOR) music, news and sports.  In 1959, the Washington Evening Star, owner of WMAL AM-FM-TV in Washington, D.C., bought Transcontinent's share of the stations, as well as 1% of Shea's stake. 

Michigan businessman James Gilmore bought WSVA-AM-FM-TV in 1965.  He sold off Channel 3 in 1976. But Gilmore held onto the radio stations until 1987, when he sold them to local businessman John David VerStandig. Over the years, VerStandig added WTGD-FM, WJDV-FM, and WHBG to his radio portfolio.

Expanded Band assignment
On March 17, 1997, the Federal Communications Commission (FCC) announced that 88 stations had been given permission to move to newly available "Expanded Band" transmitting frequencies, ranging from 1610 to 1700 kHz.  WSVA was authorized to move from 550 to 1700 kHz. 

A construction permit for the expanded band station was assigned the call sign WEZI on November 17, 1997. However this station was never built, and its construction permit was cancelled on January 16, 2004.

New studios and FM translator
In 2009, WSVA moved into a new building with modern studios and offices.  It is located on the same property as the old building, on Heritage Center Way.

On January 1, 2015, the station began simulcasting its programming on FM translator W221CF, transmitting on 92.1 MHz.  It makes WSVA programming available to listeners who prefer FM radio.  It also exists to fill in the gaps in WSVA's nighttime coverage.  The AM transmitter cuts its power to 1,000 watts at night to protect the nighttime signal of WGR in Buffalo, New York, and other stations on 550 AM in the Eastern United States.

The sale of VerStandig Broadcasting of Harrisonburg to Saga Communications was closed on July 31, 2015.  It included WSVA and several other Shenandoah Valley radio stations.  The purchase price was $9.64 million.

Translator
In addition to the main station, WSVA is relayed by an FM translator to widen its broadcast area.

References

External links
92.1 FM and 550 AM WSVA Online

FCC History Cards for WSVA (covering 1934-1980)

SVA
News and talk radio stations in the United States
Harrisonburg, Virginia
Radio stations established in 1935
1935 establishments in Virginia